Valentine's Banksy is a 2020 mural by the graffiti artist Banksy. It appeared in Bristol, United Kingdom in the early hours of the morning on 13 February 2020, prior to Valentine's Day.

The picture shows a young girl firing a burst of red flowers and leaves from a slingshot.

Vandalism
Following the completion of the mural, it was vandalised within 48 hours.

References

Works by Banksy
2020s murals
2020 paintings
Murals in the United Kingdom
Arts in Bristol
Vandalized works of art in the United Kingdom